Sparganothina spinulosa is a species of moth of the family Tortricidae. It is found in Sinaloa, Mexico.

The length of the forewings is 8.8 mm for males and 9-10.5 mm for females. The forewings are cream coloured with dark-brown markings and scattered orange-brown scales. The hindwings are pale brown.

Etymology
The species name refers to the spined sacculus and is derived from Latin spinula (meaning a small spine).

References

Moths described in 2001
Sparganothini